A Siege Diary is a 2020 Russian drama film directed by Andrey Zaytsev. The film is the winner of the Moscow International Film Festival.

Plot 
The film takes place at the beginning of the Great Patriotic War in snow-covered Leningrad. A young woman named Olga buried her husband, she thinks that she too did not have long to live and she went to her father to say goodbye to him.

Cast

See also
 Siege of Leningrad

References

External links 
 

2020 films
2020 drama films
2020s Russian-language films
Russian drama films
Films postponed due to the COVID-19 pandemic
Russian war drama films
Russian World War II films
Films set in Saint Petersburg
Russian historical drama films